Helen of Troy  is a 1956 Warner Bros. WarnerColor epic film in CinemaScope, based on Homer's Iliad and Odyssey. It was directed by Robert Wise, from a screenplay by Hugh Gray and John Twist, adapted by Hugh Gray and N. Richard Nash. The music score was by Max Steiner and the cinematography by Harry Stradling Sr.

The film stars Rossana Podestà, Stanley Baker, Sir Cedric Hardwicke and Jacques Sernas, with Niall MacGinnis, Maxwell Reed, Nora Swinburne, Robert Douglas, Torin Thatcher, Harry Andrews, Janette Scott, Ronald Lewis, Eduardo Ciannelli, Esmond Knight and a young Brigitte Bardot as Andraste, Helen's handmaiden, her first film production shot outside France.

Plot
The film retells the story of the Trojan War in 1100 B.C., albeit with some major changes from the Iliad's storyline; Paris of Troy (Jacques Sernas) sails to Sparta to secure a peace treaty between the two powerful city-states. His ship is forced to return to Troy in a storm after he has been swept overboard on the shore of Sparta. Paris is found by Helen, queen of Sparta (Rossana Podestà) with whom he falls in love. He goes to the palace where he finds Helen's husband, king Menelaus (Niall MacGinnis), Agamemnon (Robert Douglas), Odysseus (Torin Thatcher), Achilles (Stanley Baker) and many other Greek kings debating whether to go to war with Troy. Menelaus, who is denied by Helen, sees that his wife and Paris are in love and, pretending friendship, plots Paris' death.

Warned by Helen, Paris flees and, after they are both nearly caught by the Spartans, takes Helen with him to Troy. Under the pretense of helping Menelaus regain his honor, the Greeks unite, and the siege of Troy begins. Much blood is shed in the long ordeal, with the Trojans blaming their plight on Paris and Helen until it turns out that the Greeks are solely after Troy's riches, not Helen. The siege culminates in Greek victory through the ruse of the legendary Trojan Horse. While trying to flee, Helen and Paris are cornered by Menelaus. Paris faces the Spartan king in single combat, but just as he wins the upper hand he is stabbed from behind, denying him a fair trial by arms. Helen is forced to return with Menelaus, but she is serene in the knowledge that in death she will be reunited with Paris in Elysium.

Cast

 Rossana Podestà as Helen of Troy
 Jacques Sernas as Paris
 Sir Cedric Hardwicke as Priam
 Stanley Baker as Achilles
 Niall MacGinnis as Menelaus
 Robert Douglas as Agamemnon
 Nora Swinburne as Hecuba
 Torin Thatcher as Odysseus
 Harry Andrews as Hector
 Ronald Lewis as Aeneas
 Brigitte Bardot as Andraste
 Marc Lawrence as Diomedes, ruler of Aetolia
 Maxwell Reed as Ajax, Prince of Salamis
 Robert Brown as Polydorus, the youngest son of Priam
 Barbara Cavan as Cora
 Patricia Marmont as Andromache
 Guido Notari as Nestor
 Tonio Selwart as Alephous
 George Zoritch as Singer
 Esmond Knight as High Priest
 Terence Longdon as Patroclus
 Janette Scott as Cassandra
 Eduardo Ciannelli as Andros

Production
The film was made in Rome's Cinecittà Studios and in Punta Ala, Grosseto.

The scene of the Greeks' initial assault on the walls of Troy features a series of shots that are directly copied from a sequence in the Persian attack on Babylon in D. W. Griffiths' silent film classic Intolerance. Some shots from this sequence would in turn be reused in the introductionary scenes of the 1963 film Jason and the Argonauts.

This project makes several departures from the original story, including showing Paris as a hero and great leader, and most of the Greek lords as treacherous and opportunistic pirates who are using Helen's flight as an excuse to win the treasures of Troy. The 2003 miniseries sharing its name with this film would later partially re-employ this plot device.

Reception
Bosley Crowther of The New York Times wrote that some parts were "well done", including the Greek descent from the Trojan horse which "has the air of great adventure that one expects from this tale", but "the human drama in the legend ... is completely lost or never realized in the utter banalities of the script, in the clumsiness of the English dialogue and in the inexcusable acting cliches." Variety wrote, "The word 'spectacular' achieves its true meaning when applied to Warner Bros.' 'Helen of Troy.' The retelling of the Homeric legend, filmed in its entirety in Italy, makes lavish use of the Cinemascope screen ... Action sequences alone should stir word-of-mouth." Edwin Schallert of the Los Angeles Times wrote, "'Helen of Troy' qualifies as a mighty film impression of history and legend ... The Warner film satisfies the demands for beauty, and also attains triumphant effects, which give real life to ancient battles with spear, bow and arrow, fire, sword and javelin. In their magnitude attacks on the walled city of Troy are awe-inspiring." Richard L. Coe of The Washington Post reported, "The popcorn set and I had a glorious time at this epic ... I don't suppose the genteel set will go much for this one, but, boy, those crowd scenes, warriors falling to destruction, flames flaming, javelins nipping into a chest here and there." Harrison's Reports declared, "The massiveness and opulence of the settings, the size of the huge cast, and the magnitude of the battle between the Greeks and the Trojans are indeed eye-filling ... Unfortnately, the breathtaking quality of the production values is not matched by the stilted story, which takes considerable dramatic license with the Homer version of the events leading up to the Trojan war, and which are at best only moderately interesting." The Monthly Film Bulletin found the film "uninterestingly dialogued and characterised  ... The battle scenes, however, are vigorously and sometimes excitingly staged." John McCarten of The New Yorker wrote that the film "hasn't enough life to hold your interest consistently. That's too bad, for toward the end there are those battle scenes and a fine impersonation of that wooden horse."

Comic book adaptation
 Dell Four Color #684 (March 1956). Full-color photo-cover • 34 pages, 33 in full-color • Drawn by John Buscema • Copyright 1956 by Warner Bros., Inc. ( Remarkably faithful to the look of the film. However – unlike both the film and the legend – it has a happy ending for Paris and Helen. He survives, and they remain together. )

See also
 List of American films of 1956
 List of historical drama films
 Greek mythology in popular culture
 Troy (film)

References

External links
 
 
 
 
 Helen of Troy (1956) at DBCult Film Institute

1956 drama films
1956 films
American epic films
Films scored by Max Steiner
Films based on multiple works
Films based on the Iliad
Films directed by Robert Wise
Films set in ancient Greece
French drama films
Italian drama films
Films with screenplays by N. Richard Nash
Trojan War films
Warner Bros. films
Siege films
Films adapted into comics
Cultural depictions of Helen of Troy
Agamemnon
CinemaScope films
1950s English-language films
1950s American films
1950s Italian films
1950s French films